Diacrisia aurapsa is a moth of the family Erebidae. It was described by Robert Swinhoe in 1905. It is found on Saparua in Indonesia.

References

Arctiina
Moths described in 1905